Gregory Derayle Buckner (born September 16, 1976) is an American former professional basketball player who is the associate head coach for the Cleveland Cavaliers of the National Basketball Association (NBA). He had previously served as an assistant coach for the Memphis Grizzlies.

Selected in the second round (53rd pick overall) of the 1998 NBA draft by the Dallas Mavericks after playing college basketball at Clemson, he played for the Mavericks, Philadelphia 76ers, Denver Nuggets, Minnesota Timberwolves and Grizzlies. Buckner's first professional experience came with the Grand Rapids Hoops of the Continental Basketball Association (CBA), where he averaged 8.6 points and 3.9 rebounds per game in the 1998–99 season.

Playing career

College career
During his time with the Clemson Tigers, he started all 122 games of his career while guiding the team to three NCAA tournaments. Buckner led the team in scoring all four years becoming the first Clemson Tiger to do so. In 1995, Buckner was named ACC Rookie of the Year. He was entered into the Clemson Athletic Hall of Fame in 2005.

Professional career
After playing with the Dallas Mavericks from 1999 to 2002, Buckner signed with the Philadelphia 76ers as a free agent. Then he signed with the Denver Nuggets. In 2006, he re-signed with the Dallas Mavericks, but after one season, he was traded to the Timberwolves for Trenton Hassell on September 28, 2007. On June 27, 2008, the Timberwolves traded him to the Memphis Grizzlies with O. J. Mayo, Marko Jarić, and Antoine Walker for Kevin Love, Mike Miller, Brian Cardinal, and Jason Collins.

On July 9, 2009, Buckner was traded to the Dallas Mavericks as a part of the four-team deal among Grizzlies, Mavericks, Orlando Magic and Toronto Raptors.

Coaching career
On July 29, 2011, he joined the Houston Rockets as a player development coach, serving for five seasons. Buckner reached the playoffs three times with the team as part of the coaching staff. He would later become an assistant coach with the Memphis Grizzlies, and in November 2020, became an assistant coach with the Cleveland Cavaliers. On April 21, 2021, Buckner got his first NBA head coaching victory when he temporarily replaced head coach J. B. Bickerstaff as the Cavaliers won 121–105 against the Chicago Bulls. On June 13, 2022, the Cavaliers promoted Buckner to associate head coach position.

Career statistics

Regular season

|-
| style="text-align:left;"|
| style="text-align:left;"|Dallas
| 48 || 1 || 19.2 || .476 || .385 || .683 || 3.6 || 1.1 || .8 || .4 || 5.7
|-
| style="text-align:left;"|
| style="text-align:left;"|Dallas
| 37 || 9 || 22.2 || .438 || .286 || .728 || 4.2 || 1.3 || .9 || .2 || 6.2
|-
| style="text-align:left;"|
| style="text-align:left;"|Dallas
| 44 || 16 || 20.1 || .525 || .313 || .690 || 3.9 || 1.1 || .7 || .4 || 5.8
|-
| style="text-align:left;"|
| style="text-align:left;"|Philadelphia
| 75 || 5 || 20.2 || .465 || .273 || .802 || 2.9 || 1.3 || 1.0 || .2 || 6.0
|-
| style="text-align:left;"|
| style="text-align:left;"|Philadelphia
| 53 || 3 || 13.3 || .377 || .273 || .741 || 1.9 || .8 || .4 || .1 || 3.1
|-
| style="text-align:left;"|
| style="text-align:left;"|Denver
| 70 || 41 || 21.7 || .528 || .405 || .778 || 3.0 || 1.9 || 1.1 || .1 || 6.2
|-
| style="text-align:left;"|
| style="text-align:left;"|Denver
| 73 || 27 || 24.1 || .434 || .354 || .782 || 2.9 || 1.7 || 1.2 || .3 || 6.7
|-
| style="text-align:left;"|
| style="text-align:left;"|Dallas
| 76 || 11 || 18.1 || .411 || .311 || .794 || 2.1 || .9 || .6 || .1 || 4.0
|-
| style="text-align:left;"|
| style="text-align:left;"|Minnesota
| 31 || 4 || 16.8 || .385 || .300 || .864 || 2.1 || 1.3 || .7 || .1 || 4.0
|-
| style="text-align:left;"|
| style="text-align:left;"|Memphis
| 63 || 0 || 13.9 || .384 || .255 || .800 || 2.1 || .9 || .5 || .1 || 2.5
|- class="sortbottom"
| style="text-align:center;" colspan="2"|Career
| 570 || 117 || 19.1 || .450 || .334 || .757 || 2.8 || 1.3 || .8 || .2 || 5.0

Playoffs

|-
| style="text-align:left;"|2001
| style="text-align:left;"|Dallas
| 5 || 0 || 15.0 || .478 || .333 || .700 || 4.2 || .6 || 1.0 || .0 || 6.0
|-
| style="text-align:left;"|2002
| style="text-align:left;"|Dallas
| 7 || 0 || 15.0 || .480 || .000 || .750 || 3.7 || .6 || .4 || .1 || 3.9
|-
| style="text-align:left;"|2003
| style="text-align:left;"|Philadelphia
| 10 || 0 || 11.2 || .323 || .222 || 1.000 || 1.7 || .3 || .1 || .2 || 2.6
|-
| style="text-align:left;"|2005
| style="text-align:left;"|Denver
| 5 || 2 || 20.0 || .222 || .222 ||  || 3.2 || 1.0 || .4 || .2 || 2.0
|-
| style="text-align:left;"|2006
| style="text-align:left;"|Denver
| 5 || 4 || 27.4 || .418 || .313 || .875 || 2.8 || 1.2 || .6 || .2 || 12.6
|-
| style="text-align:left;"|2007
| style="text-align:left;"|Dallas
| 6 || 0 || 7.3 || .000 || .000 || .500 || 1.0 || .3 || .3 || .2 || .2
|- class="sortbottom"
| style="text-align:center;" colspan="2"|Career
| 38 || 6 || 15.1 || .377 || .259 || .786 || 2.6 || .6 || .4 || .2 || 4.1

References

External links

1976 births
Living people
African-American basketball players
American men's basketball players
Basketball coaches from Kentucky
Basketball players from Kentucky
Clemson Tigers men's basketball players
Cleveland Cavaliers assistant coaches
Dallas Mavericks draft picks
Dallas Mavericks players
Denver Nuggets players
Houston Rockets assistant coaches
Grand Rapids Hoops players
Medalists at the 1997 Summer Universiade
Memphis Grizzlies assistant coaches
Memphis Grizzlies players
Minnesota Timberwolves players
Philadelphia 76ers players
Shooting guards
Small forwards
Sportspeople from Hopkinsville, Kentucky
Universiade gold medalists for the United States
Universiade medalists in basketball
21st-century African-American sportspeople
20th-century African-American sportspeople